Yangji Lee (March 15, 1955 – May 22, 1992) was a second generation Zainichi Korean novelist born in Nishikatsura, Yamanashi, Japan. When she was in grade school, her parents acquired Japanese citizenship and her nationality became Japanese at that time. Upon naturalization, she adopted the name Tanaka Yoshie (jap. 田中 淑枝).

In 1982, while studying at Seoul National University, Lee published her work Nabi Taryong in the literary magazine Gunzou and her career as a writer began. In 1988, her work Yuhi won the 100th Akutagawa Prize, making her the second Zainichi Korean to receive the prize (the first being Lee Hoesung). While writing the novel Ishi no Koe, she contracted acute myocarditis and soon died.

Bibliography 
 Woman Diver, 1983 (jap. かずきめ)
 The Other Side of a Shadow Picture, 1985 (jap. 影絵の向こう)
 The Auburn Afternoon, 1985 (jap. 鳶色の午後)
 Time Ticking, 1985 (jap. 刻)
 Yuhi (jap. 由熙, ユヒ, kor. 유희)
 The Voice of Stones, 1992 (jap. 石の声)
 The Collection of Lee Yangji, 1993 (jap. 李良枝全集)

References

External links
 Synopsis of Yuhi at JLPP (Japanese Literature Publishing Project) 

1955 births
1992 deaths
Japanese expatriates in South Korea
Japanese-language writers
20th-century Japanese novelists
20th-century Japanese women writers
Japanese people of Korean descent
Writers from Yamanashi Prefecture
Seoul National University alumni
Akutagawa Prize winners
Zainichi Korean people
Deaths from myocarditis